Devin Alexander is an American chef, author and media personality.  She is the Host of Healthy Decadence on Fit TV. She has appeared on The Today Show, Good Morning America, The Biggest Loser and Access Hollywood.

Biography

In 2006, she became a part of The Biggest Loser when she was brought on board to write The Biggest Loser Cookbook and demo recipes from it on the show.  Since that time, she has written the other four books of The Biggest Loser Cookbook series and has appeared numerous times on the show.

Starting in 2007, she became the host of Healthy Decadence with Devin Alexander on Discovery Health and Fit TV.  The show ended in 2011; however, Devin continued to share her secrets through appearances on The Today Show, Good Morning America, The Biggest Loser, Dr. Oz, Dr. Phil, The Doctors, Dr. Drew, The View, Celebrity Fit Club, Discovery Health's National Body Challenge, Fox, CNN, HGTV, USA, Style Network as well as through over 500 magazine features including Prevention, Women's Health, Men's Health and Shape.

In addition to The Biggest Loser Cookbook Series, Devin has written three additional cookbooks not aligned with The Biggest Loser brand.  Her first cookbook, Fast Food Fix (Rodale, 2006) was featured as an editor's top pick in USA Today. She also wrote  The Most Decadent Diet Ever! (Broadway, 2008),  and I Can't Believe It's Not Fattening (Broadway, 2010).

Alexander currently serves as Culinary Advisor to Men's Fitness and has served as a Cooking Expert to Women's Health.  She    is on the Advisory Board of the  American Culinary Federation's Chef Child Foundation  and Larry King Foundation's Go-To-Chef to speak on "Obesity in America."

Books
Alexander is the author of eight cookbooks:
 Fast Food Fix (Rodale, April 18, 2006)  – 
 The Biggest Loser Cookbook (Rodale, October 3, 2006)  –  (a New York Times bestseller)  
 The Biggest Loser Family Cookbook (Rodale, November 11, 2008)  – 
 The Most Decadent Diet Ever! (Broadway Books, April 22, 2008)  – 
 I Can’t Believe It’s Not Fattening (Broadway, March 9, 2010)  – 
 The Biggest Loser Dessert Cookbook (Rodale, November 9, 2010)  – 
 The Biggest Loser Flavors of the World Cookbook (Rodale March 15, 2010)  – 
 The Biggest Loser Quick and Easy Cookbook (Rodale, November 8, 2011)  –  (a New York Times bestseller)

References

External links
 
 

American women chefs
Living people
American television chefs
American food writers
Women food writers
Smith College alumni
21st-century American non-fiction writers
21st-century American women writers
American women non-fiction writers
Year of birth missing (living people)